Down South Hustlers: Bouncin' and Swingin' is a compilation album released by No Limit Records. It was released on October 31, 1995 as one of the first releases through the No Limit/Priority Records partnership. The album didn't make it as high as some of No Limit's later releases, but it managed to peak at #139 on the Billboard 200 and #13 on the Top R&B/Hip-Hop Albums chart. It spawned the classic Down South collaboration "Playaz From Da South" featuring Master P, Silkk the Shocker (both members of TRU) and UGK. It also marked the only appearances of No Limit artists CGC, Fire, Sir True and Polo. The album was certified gold by RIAA.

Track listing

Charts

Weekly charts

Year-end charts

References

External links
 Down South Hustlers: Bouncin' and Swingin' at Discogs

Hip hop compilation albums
Record label compilation albums
1995 compilation albums
No Limit Records compilation albums
Priority Records compilation albums
Gangsta rap compilation albums